Dizang Temple is a Buddhist temple located in Fuzhou, Fujian, China. It is currently a well-known nunnery for Buddhist nuns of Caodong school.

History

Imperial China
Originally built in 527 during the reign of Emperor Wu of the Liang dynasty (502–557), it was called "Falin Bhiksuni Temple". The temple was restored in 894, in the 1st year of Qianning period of the Tang dynasty (618–907). It was renamed "Bao'en Temple" in the mid-5th century during the Five Dynasties (907–979). After the reconstruction in 1864 in the Tongzhi era of the Qing dynasty (1644–1911), its name was changed to "Dizang Temple".

Modern China
During the Republic of China, it became a nunnery of Pure Land Buddhism. During the devastating Cultural Revolution, the red guards attacked the temple and nuns. The Buddhist nuns were forced to disrobe and  the nunnery was turned into a factory. After the 3rd Plenary Session of the 11th Central Committee of the Chinese Communist Party, according to the national policy of free religious belief, the temple was finally allowed to resume its religious activities. Dizang Temple has been designated as a National Key Buddhist Temple in Han Chinese Area by the State Council of China in 1983.

Architecture
Now the existing main buildings include Shanmen, Heavenly Kings Hall, Mahavira Hall, Dabei Hall (Hall of Great Compassion), Kṣitigarbha Hall, Maitreya Hall, Skanda Hall, Guanyin Hall, Reception Hall, Dining Hall, etc.

References

Buddhist temples in Fuzhou
Buildings and structures in Fuzhou
Tourist attractions in Fuzhou
19th-century establishments in China
19th-century Buddhist temples